Grønvollfoss Station was a railway station serving Grønvollfoss in Notodden, Norway on the Tinnoset Line from 1909 to the line closed in 1991.

Designed by Thorvald Astrup it opened on 9 August 1909 as a stop called Grøndvoldsfoss. It got the current name on 1 January 1922. It became a station in 1965, but a stop again in 1976 after the station was razed. It was staffed until 1960. It was closed along with the railway on 1 January 1991.

References

External links
 Norsk Jernbaneklubb entry

Railway stations on the Tinnoset Line
Railway stations in Notodden
Railway stations opened in 1909
Railway stations closed in 1991
Disused railway stations in Norway
1909 establishments in Norway
1991 disestablishments in Norway